Blue Eyes and Exit Wounds is a spoken word/poetry album by Nick Tosches and Hubert Selby Jr.

Track listing
In the Heat of the Night (excerpt)
Only the Lonely
La Vie en Rose
A Tale of Anticipation
Psalm 16 (Song of Forgiveness)
It Takes One to Know One
What the Coptic Guy Said
A Feast for the Eyes
From the Dream-Book of Artemidorus
My Kind of Loving
Contrapasso
Ptolemy II 
May the Gods without Names Redeem Me
Erebos 
I with a Knife to the Throat of Cybele
Dante in Ravenna
I Dig Girls

Tracks 1–6 are written and performed by Hubert Selby Jr.  Tracks 7–17 were written and performed by Nick Tosches.

Personnel
Nick Tosches – vocals, texts
Hubert Selby Jr. – vocals, texts
Harold Goldberg – production
Dan Bosworth – engineering
Scott Lawrence Whitman – photography and design

References

External links
 http://exitwounds.com/

Hubert Selby Jr. albums
Nick Tosches albums
1998 albums
Spoken word albums by American artists